John Thoresby was a burgess of Great Grimsby who served briefly as one of its two members of parliament in 1411.

References 

Year of birth missing
Year of death missing
English MPs 1411
Members of the Parliament of England for Great Grimsby